Cleisostoma crochetii is a species of orchid found in Vietnam, Cambodia and Laos.

References

External links 

crochetii
Orchids of Cambodia
Orchids of Laos
Orchids of Vietnam